Alchemy: Dire Straits Live is a double album and the first live album by British rock band Dire Straits, released on 8 February 1984 by Vertigo Records internationally, and by Warner Bros. Records in the United States. Recorded at the Hammersmith Odeon in London on 22–23 July 1983, the album features songs from the band's first four albums, the ExtendedancEPlay EP and Mark Knopfler's Local Hero soundtrack. Many of the songs have reworked arrangements and extended improvisational segments. The album cover is taken from a painting by Brett Whiteley.

Alchemy: Dire Straits Live was remastered and reissued with the rest of the Dire Straits catalogue in 1996 for most of the world outside the United States and was remastered and re-released in the USA on 8 May 2001.

Recording
Alchemy: Dire Straits Live was recorded live at the Hammersmith Odeon in London on 22–23 July 1983, the final two concerts of Dire Straits' eight-month Love Over Gold Tour promoting their album Love Over Gold. The concerts were recorded by Mick McKenna using the Rolling Stones Mobile unit. The recording was mixed at AIR Studios in London in November 1983 where Nigel Walker was the engineer.

The opening track, "Once Upon a Time in the West" is preceded by an uncredited version of the "Stargazer" instrumental from the Local Hero soundtrack. "Tunnel of Love" is preceded by an otherwise unrecorded instrumental (actually faded in from the extended coda of "Portobello Belle", which was left off the album), already played on the 1981 tour, but here re-arranged to showcase Mel Collins' saxophone. It is followed by the brief "Carousel Waltz" intro and standard version of the song (with improvisation sections).

Cover artwork
The album cover artwork was adapted from a section of a painting by Brett Whiteley titled Alchemy 1974. Alchemy is a hypothetical process once believed to turn ordinary elements into gold. The image of a guitar with lips held by a hand was added for the album design and covers sexually suggestive imagery in the original. The original painting, done between 1972 and 1973, was composed of many different elements and on 18 wood panels 203 cm x 1615 cm x 9 cm. In terms of media it used everything from feathers and part of a bird's nest to a glass eye, shell, plugs and brain in a work that becomes a transmutation of sexual organic landscapes and mindscapes. It has been regarded as a self-portrait, a giant outpouring of energy and ideas brought forth over a long period of time.

Critical reception
Reviewing retrospectively for AllMusic, critic William Ruhlmann wrote of the album "There is an interesting contrast .... between the music, much of which is slow and moody, with Mark Knopfler's muttered vocals and large helpings of his fingerpicking on what sounds like an amplified Spanish guitar, and the audience response. The arena-size crowd cheers wildly, and claps and sings along when given half a chance, as though each song were an up-tempo rocker." Ruhlmann concludes, "The CD version of the album contains one extra track, "Love Over Gold," which adds a needed change of pace to the otherwise slow-moving first disc."

Track listing
All songs were written by Mark Knopfler, except where indicated.

LP
Side one

Side two

Side three

Side four

CD
"Love over Gold", which had been released as a separate single in 1984, was added into the track list for the CD release, and the fade outs between sides 1 and 2 and sides 3 and 4 have been removed. A number of tracks had their length increased for the CD releases, and the track order is slightly different: "Romeo and Juliet" and "Expresso Love" are in reversed order.

Disc one

Disc two

Outtakes
Three more songs were recorded live but not included on the official album release: "Industrial Disease," "Twisting by the Pool" and "Portobello Belle".

An edited version of "Portobello Belle" (length: 4:33) and a remixed version of "Telegraph Road" were included on the CD version of the compilation Money for Nothing, released in 1988 (Money for Nothing was re-mastered in 1996 as part of the "Dire Straits Re-Mastered" series. The album was then deleted to make way for the Sultans of Swing - The Best of Dire Straits CD released shortly after).

Personnel
Dire Straits
 Mark Knopfler – guitar, vocals
 Alan Clark – keyboards
 John Illsley – bass guitar, backing vocals
 Hal Lindes – guitar, backing vocals
 Terry Williams – drums

Additional musicians
 Mel Collins – saxophone
 Tommy Mandel – keyboards
 Joop de Korte – percussion

Production
 Mark Knopfler – producer
 Mick McKenna – recording engineer
 Nigel Walker – engineer
 Jeremy Allom – assistant engineer
 Brett Whiteley – artwork (adapted from Alchemy 1974) 
 C More Tone Studios – design

Video release

The concert film was originally released in Beta, VHS video cassette and Laserdisc formats, and digitally remastered in 1995. 2010 saw new DVD and Blu-ray Disc releases of the concert with surround sound mixes prepared by Chuck Ainlay and the original video footage digitally enhanced and cleaned by Dick Carruthers. The song "Love over Gold" is not included in the video, just like the original album, but is available on the compilation Sultans of Swing: The Very Best of Dire Straits. It includes a mix of the live band footage with circus spectacle scenes. The 2010 Blu-ray release also included the BBC Arena documentary about Dire Straits aired in 1980.

The Alchemy video opens with scenes of the band in a pub playing pool, interspersed with concert clips. Playing over this is the song Saturday Night at the Movies performed by The Drifters. The music changes to the instrumental "Stargazer", from the film Local Hero, over external shots of a sold-out Hammersmith Odeon. The scene switches to the inside of the venue as Dire Straits are announced and walk onstage for the concert. The closing credits again use the Drifters' "Saturday Night at the Movies".

 A Limelight Films Production
 Director – Peter Sinclair
 Film Editor – Peter Goddard
 Soundtrack produced by Mark Knopfler
 Recorded by Mick McKenna, Rolling Stones Mobile

Charts

Album

Video

Certifications

Album

Video

References

External links
 Alchemy at Mark Knopfler official website
 Alchemy Live (TV, 1984) at IMDb

Dire Straits live albums
1984 live albums
Albums produced by Mark Knopfler
1984 video albums
Live video albums
PolyGram video albums
Vertigo Records live albums
Warner Records live albums
Warner Records video albums
Albums recorded at the Hammersmith Apollo